Blindside, Blind Side or The Blind Side may refer to:
 "Blind side", a term in American and Canadian football for an area protected by a left or right tackle
 Blindside, a term used with similar meanings in rugby league and in rugby union
 The Blind Side: Evolution of a Game, a 2006 book about American football

Film
 Blindside (film), a 1986 film
 Blind Side (1993 film), a 1993 made-for-television film
 The Blind Side (film), a 2009 film based on the book
 "The Blind Side" (Family Guy), a 2012 episode of the television show Family Guy

Music
 Blindside (band), a Swedish post-hardcore band
 Blindside (album), 1997
 "Blind Side" (Hybrid song), a song and EP by the British breakbeat band Hybrid
 "Blindside", a song by the band Secrets on the 2012 album The Ascent
 Blindside (Sister Grotto album), 2016

See also
Blindsided (disambiguation)